Valvata macrostoma, also known as the large mouthed valve snail, is a species of minute freshwater snail with an operculum, an aquatic gastropod mollusk in the family Valvatidae, the valve snails.

Distribution
This species occurs in the following countries and islands:
 Czech Republic - in Bohemia only
 Slovakia
 Poland
 Germany - high endangered (Stark gefährdet)
 Netherlands
 Great Britain

Ecology
This freshwater snail lives in marshes and very small canals that have a very rich fauna and calcium-rich water.

Myzyk (2004) described life cycle of Valvata macrostoma.

References

Valvatidae
Gastropods of Europe
Freshwater animals of Europe
Gastropods described in 1864
Taxa named by Otto Andreas Lowson Mörch